New York's 39th State Assembly district is one of the 150 districts in the New York State Assembly. It has been represented by Catalina Cruz since 2019.

Geography
District 39 is in Queens. It encompasses the neighborhoods of Corona, Elmhurst, and Jackson Heights, Queens.

Recent election results

2016

2020

2018

2018 special

2016

2014

2012

2010

References

39